Bakhtawar Pur is a census town city in North west delhi in the Indian State of DELHI.

References

Cities and towns in North West Delhi district